Yu-Shan Lin is a computational chemist.  She is an associate professor of chemistry at Tufts University in the United States. Her research lab uses computational chemistry to understand and design biomolecules, with topics focusing on cyclic peptides, protein folding, and collagen.

Education 
Lin received her BS in Chemistry from National Taiwan University in 2004. Lin received her PhD in Chemistry in 2009 from University of Wisconsin, Madison, under the guidance of James L. Skinner. She then moved to Stanford, where she was a Bio-X postdoctoral fellow in the lab of Vijay S. Pande. In 2012, Lin joined the Department of Chemistry at Tufts University and received tenure in 2018.

Research

Cyclic peptides 
Lin and her lab use computational chemistry to provide information on the solution structures of cyclic peptides. They recently successfully used molecular dynamics simulation with enhanced sampling methods to design well-structured cyclic peptides.

Protein folding 
Lin and her lab are interested in understanding how co- and post-translational modifications and non-natural amino acids impact protein folding. They also work on understanding the effects of amino acid substitutions during evolution on protein stability, folding, and interaction.

Collagen 
Lin and her lab use molecular dynamics simulations to understand how the structure, stability, and interactions of collagen are perturbed by Gly to Ser substitutions, a very common type of Gly missense mutations in patients with Osteogenesis Imperfecta (OI), and Ser phosphorylation. Their results suggest a new possible mechanism underlying OI pathology, specifically that mutations may significantly disrupt the triple-helical structure of collagen and render it susceptible to non-collagenase proteolytic enzymes.

Awards and honors 
 2015: OpenEye Outstanding Junior Faculty Award in Computational Chemistry, American Chemical Society

References

External links 

1982 births
Living people
National Taiwan University alumni
Tufts University faculty
University of Wisconsin–Madison alumni
Taiwanese chemists
Taiwanese women scientists
Computational chemists